Missy O'Reilly is an actress/comedian best known as a cast member on MTV's hidden camera show Boiling Points. She has also appeared as various characters on Late Night with Conan O'Brien and Upright Citizens Brigade as well appearing in the film Martin & Orloff and New York City Serenade. She is currently a series regular on CMT's Prankville. She is a co-owner of a New York City karaoke lounge called "Planet Rose".

Television Work
Primetime:What Would You Do - Manager/Atheist/Waitress/Girl on crutches/Bbq boss (2015)The Residuals TV series - Colleen (2014)Brain Games TV series - Falling girl (2014)Prankville TV Series - Series regular (2007-)Boiling Points  TV Series - Series regular (2003–2007)[[Late Night with Conan O'Brien]] - Various characters (2002-)Upright Citizens Brigade'' -  Various characters (1998–1999)

Filmography
New York City Serenade (2007) (post-production) - Girl 2
Martin & Orloff (2002) (as Marie O'Reilly) - M. Force Secretary

External links

Year of birth missing (living people)
Living people
American television actresses
American film actresses
21st-century American women